Baren (1901–1972) was a modern Chinese writer, critic and translator.

Biography 
Baren was born Wang Renshu in Fenghua, Zhejiang. He went to elementary school when he was 8, and entered the Fourth Normal School of Zhejiang in 1915. After graduating in 1920, he became a grade school teacher. In 1923 he started to write short stories and poems, and joined the Literature Research Society. One year later, Baren became a member of the Chinese Communist Party. In 1930, he joined the League of the Left-Wing Writers. When the anti-Japanese War broke out, Baren stayed in Shanghai to publicize anti-war culture. In 1942, he went to Indonesia, pursuing the anti-war movement. He returned to China in 1948.

After the founding of the People's Republic of China, he served as Chinese ambassador to Indonesia and the director of the People's Literature Publishing House. Baren was persecuted and put to death during the Cultural Revolution.

Baren preferred fiction writing. He created collections of short stories including Jail, Shack, In the Decline and Martyrdom, novellas such as Vagrant Life of Ah Quei and Badge, and the novel Rebellion of Mang Xiucai. His work on literary theory, On Literature, was heavily influenced by the ideals of anti-Soviet critics.

References

 1992  /1

1972 deaths
1901 births
Ambassadors of China to Indonesia
Writers from Ningbo
Republic of China novelists
Politicians from Ningbo
Victims of the Cultural Revolution
Republic of China essayists
Chinese male short story writers
Republic of China journalists
People's Republic of China essayists
People's Republic of China historians
20th-century Chinese historians
Chinese male novelists
People's Republic of China novelists
20th-century Chinese novelists
Historians from Zhejiang
20th-century essayists
Short story writers from Zhejiang
Republic of China short story writers
People's Republic of China short story writers
Chinese literary theorists